St. Mary's College is a national school in Trincomalee, Sri Lanka.

History
The school was founded in 1864. In 1922 the college began to function under the apostolic carmel sisters. At that time there were three assistants with 43 students under the head mistress. in 1963 the Tamil school was amalgamated with the English school. The college celebrated the golden jubilee of the arrival of A.C. sisters in Trincomalee in 1972-September.

See also
 List of schools in Eastern Province, Sri Lanka

References

Educational institutions established in 1864
National schools in Sri Lanka
Schools in Trincomalee
1864 establishments in Ceylon